List of intelligence agencies of Poland:

Second Polish Republic (1918-1939) 
 Biuro Wywiadowcze Ministerstwa Spraw Wewnętrznych
 Wydział Informacyjny Ministerstwa Spraw Wewnętrznych
 Inspektorat Defensywy Politycznej at the National Police Headquarters (przy Komendzie Głównej Policji Państwowej (IDP KGPP)_
 Oddział II Sztabu Generalnego WP – military intelligence and counterintelligence
 Biuro Szyfrów (Cipher Bureau) – radio espionage, cryptography

World War II 
 Oddział II Sztabu Naczelnego Wodza PSZ
 Oddział II Komendy Głównej SZP/ZWZ/AK

People's Polish Republic (1944-1990) 
 Resort Bezpieczeństwa Publicznego, RBP – (1944–1945)
 Ministerstwo Bezpieczeństwa Publicznego, MBP – (1945–1954) (Ministry of Public Security)
 Komitet do spraw Bezpieczeństwa Publicznego, Kds.BP – (1954–1956) '
 Ministerstwo Spraw Wewnętrznych (Ministry of Internal Affairs)
 Służba Bezpieczeństwa Ministerstwa Spraw Wewnętrznych (Security Service of the Ministry of Internal Affairs)
 Departament I Ministerstwa Spraw Wewnętrznych - foreign
 Departament II Ministerstwa Spraw Wewnętrznych - counterespionage
 Biuro Studiów Służby Bezpieczeństwa MSW - (1982–1989) - focusing on domestic opposition
 Oddział II Sztabu Generalnego Wojska Polskiego (1945–1951)
 Zarząd II Sztabu Generalnego Wojska Polskiego (1951–1990)
 Agenturalny Wywiad Operacyjny, AWO
 Główny Zarząd Informacji, GZI (WP/MON/Kds.BP) – (1945–1957)
 Wojskowa Służba Wewnętrzna MON, WSW MON (1957–1990) (Internal Military Service)

Poland (1990-2019) 
 Agencja Bezpieczeństwa Wewnętrznego (2002–present) (Internal Security Agency, ABW), since 2002
 Agencja Wywiadu (2002–present) (Intelligence Agency, AW), since 2002
 Centralne Biuro Antykorupcyjne (2006–present) (Central Anticorruption Bureau, CBA) - focused on investigations connected with all kinds of financial crimes.
 Służba Kontrwywiadu Wojskowego - from 2006 (SKW) - counterespionage
 Służba Wywiadu Wojskowego - from 2006 (SWW) - espionage
General Police Headquarters of Poland (KGP) (criminal intelligence) since 1990
Bureau of Criminal Intelligence and Information (each of the Voivodeship Police Commands has also a corresponding department) since 2016
Centralne Biuro Śledcze Policji (CBŚP) (Central Investigations Bureau of the Police) since 2002
 General Inspector of Financial Information (GIIF) (financial intelligence) since 2005
 Wywiad Skarbowy (1998–2017) (Internal Revenue Intelligence of the Ministry of Finance), replaced by the Tax and Customs Service
 Urząd Ochrony Państwa (Office for State Protection, UOP) - replaced on 29 June 2002 by  ABW and AW,
 Wojskowe Służby Informacyjne (Military Information Services, WSI) replaced on 30 September 2006 by SKW and SWW
 Tax and Customs Service (SCS) (tax intelligence) since 2017
 National Centre for Cryptology (2013-2019) (military SIGINT and cryptology), replaced by the National Centre for Cyberspace Security
 Narodowe Centrum Bezpieczeństwa Cyberprzestrzeni (NCBC - National Centre for Cyberspace Security) (military SIGINT, cyberwarfare and cryptology) since 2019

Poland (2019-present) 
Agencja Wywiadu (AW) (Foreign Intelligence Agency, also principal SIGINT and IMINT agency)
Agencja Bezpieczeństwa Wewnętrznego (ABW) (Internal Security Agency - domestic and counter-intelligence, counter-terrorism, counter-extremism, domestic SIGINT)
Służba Wywiadu Wojskowego (SWW) (Military Intelligence Service including SIGINT and IMINT)
Służba Kontrwywiadu Wojskowego (SKW) (Military Counter-intelligence Service including SIGINT)
Centralne Biuro Antykorupcyjne (CBA) (Central Anticorruption Bureau)
General Police Headquarters of Poland (KGP) (criminal intelligence)
Biuro Wywiadu i Informacji Kryminalnych (BWiIK) (Bureau of Criminal Intelligence and Information)
Each of the Voivodeship Police Commands has also a corresponding department
Centralne Biuro Śledcze Policji (CBŚP) (Central Investigations Bureau of the Police)
 Zarząd Operacyjno-Śledczy Komendy Głównej Straży Granicznej (ZOŚ KGSG) (Operations and Investigations Directorate of the Border Guard Headquarters) - border, immigration, air traffic and related criminal intelligence
Służba Ochrony Państwa (SOP) - intelligence concerning personal security of principal state officials
Straż Marszałkowska (SM) - intelligence concerning security of the houses of Parliament 
Criminal Directorate of the Military Gendarmerie Headquarters (ZK KGŻW)
Tax and Customs Service (SCS) (tax intelligence)
General Inspector of Financial Information (GIIF) (financial intelligence)

Other contemporary military units involved in:
 IMINT
Polish IMINT Centre (ORO)
12th Unmanned Aerial Vehicles Base (12.BBSP)
Military Unit NIL "Brigadier General August Emil Fieldorf «Nil»" (JW NIL)
 SIGINT
 Reconnaissance Group of 3rd Ship Flotilla (gOR 3.FO)
 Centre for Radioelectronic Combat Reconnaissance and Support ″Lieutenant Colonel Jan Kowalewski″ (CRiWWRE)
 2th Przasnysz Radioelectronic Reconnaissance Regiment (2.ORel)
 6th Oliwa Radioelectronic Reconnaissance Regiment ″Admiral Arendt Dickman″ (6.ORel)
 Military Unit NIL "Brigadier General August Emil Fieldorf «Nil»" (JW NIL)
 Narodowe Centrum Bezpieczeństwa Cyberprzestrzeni (NCBC) - National Centre for Cyberspace Security) (SIGINT, cyberwarfare and cryptology)

See also
History of Polish intelligence services

 
Poland
Intelligence